Atlantoraja is a genus of skates in the family Arhynchobatidae. These fish are all considered threatened due to the intense fishing pressure within their range.

Species
There are three extant and one extinct species recognized within the genus:

 Atlantoraja castelnaui (A. Miranda-Ribeiro, 1907) (Spotback skate)
 †Atlantoraja cecilae (Steurbaut & Herman, 1978)
 Atlantoraja cyclophora (Regan, 1903) (Eyespot skate)
 Atlantoraja platana (Günther, 1880) (La Plata skate)

References 
 

 
Rajidae
Ray genera
Taxonomy articles created by Polbot